Edil Albert Rosenqvist (11 December 1892 – 14 September 1973) was a Finnish wrestler and Olympic medalist in Greco-Roman wrestling.

Olympics
Rosenqvist competed at the 1920 Summer Olympics in Antwerp where he received a silver medal in Greco-Roman wrestling, the light heavyweight class.

At the 1924 Summer Olympics in Paris he received a silver medal in the heavyweight class.

References

External links
 

1892 births
1973 deaths
Olympic wrestlers of Finland
Wrestlers at the 1920 Summer Olympics
Wrestlers at the 1924 Summer Olympics
Wrestlers at the 1928 Summer Olympics
Finnish male sport wrestlers
Olympic silver medalists for Finland
Olympic medalists in wrestling
Medalists at the 1920 Summer Olympics
Medalists at the 1924 Summer Olympics
Sportspeople from Uusimaa
19th-century Finnish people
20th-century Finnish people